Alfredo José Henriques Nascimento (born 5 May 1937), known as Nascimento, is a Portuguese retired footballer who played as a goalkeeper.

Club career
Born in Montijo, Portugal, Nascimento arrived at 22 to C.F. Os Belenenses, being back-up to José Pereira, but playing most games in  1963–64.

He joined S.L. Benfica in the following year, with Costa Pereira having physical problems, he replaced him in a winning league campaign in 1966–67. However, the rapid ascension of Zé Gato, stalled his career at Benfica, so he moved to União de Tomar in 1970 and retired four years later, age 37.

Honours
Benfica
Primeira Liga: 1964–65, 1966–67, 1968–69

References

External links
Nascimento at Zerozero

1937 births
Living people
People from Montijo, Portugal
Portuguese footballers
Association football goalkeepers
Primeira Liga players
C.F. Os Belenenses players
S.L. Benfica footballers
U.F.C.I. Tomar players
Sportspeople from Setúbal District